Axel Crone Cruusberg (30 December 1901 — 16 August 1962), was a Danish chess player.

Biography
In the 1930s, Axel Cruusberg was one of Danish leading chess players. From 1922 to 1935, Cruusberg took part in the Danish Chess Championships, where he achieved his best result in 1925, when he ranked in fourth place. He three times won the Copenhagen Chess Championship: in 1931, 1937 and 1943. From 1942 to 1944, he worked in Danish chess magazine, Skakbladet.

Axel Cruusberg played for Denmark in the Chess Olympiad:
 In 1931, at second board in the 4th Chess Olympiad in Prague (+1, =3, -11).

References

External links

Axel Cruusberg chess games at 365chess.com

1901 births
1962 deaths
Sportspeople from Odense
Danish chess players
Chess Olympiad competitors
20th-century chess players